The 2015–16 Missouri State Bears basketball team represented Missouri State University during the 2015–16 NCAA Division I men's basketball season. The Bears, led by fifth year head coach Paul Lusk, played their home games at JQH Arena and were members of the Missouri Valley Conference. They finished the season 13–19, 8–10 in Missouri Valley play to finish in a tie for sixth place. They defeated Drake in the first round of the Missouri Valley tournament to advance to the quarterfinals where they lost to Evansville.

Previous season 
The Bears finished the season 11–20, 5–13 in MVC play to finish in eighth place. They lost in the first round of the Missouri Valley tournament to Southern Illinois.

Departures

Incoming Transfers

Incoming recruits

Roster

Schedule

|-
!colspan=9 style="background:#800000; color:#FFFFFF;"| Exhibition

|-
!colspan=9 style="background:#800000; color:#FFFFFF;"| Non-Conference Regular season

|-
!colspan=12 style="background:#800000; color:#FFFFFF;"| Missouri Valley Conference regular season

|-
!colspan=9 style="background:#800000; color:#FFFFFF;"| Missouri Valley tournament

References

Missouri State Bears basketball seasons
Missouri State